Time and Again is the second studio album by American Christian singer Kim Boyce, released in 1988 on Myrrh Records.Time and Again features her cover of Rare Earth's 1971 Top 10 hit "I Just Want to Celebrate," which was a Top 5 hit on Christian radio. The album reached the top 10 on the Billboard Top Insprirational Albums chart.

Track listing

Personnel 
 Kim Boyce – vocals, backing vocals (1-6, 8)
 Brian Tankersley – keyboards (1, 4, 5, 6), bass (1, 4, 5, 6), drum programming (1-7, 9), backing vocals (1, 6), arrangements (1, 4-7), acoustic guitar (3)
 John Andrew Schreiner – additional keyboards (2), keyboards (3, 9), bass (3, 9), arrangements (9)
 Trent Dean – keyboards (7), drum programming (7), arrangements (7)
 James Hollihan, Jr. – keyboards (8), guitars (8), drum programming (8), arrangements (8)
 George Cocchini – guitars (1, 4, 5, 9), acoustic guitar (3), electric guitar (3), arrangements (3)
 David Zycheck – guitars (2, 6)
 Spencer Campbell – bass (7, 8)
 Kirk Whalum – saxophone (1, 2, 5, 7), soprano saxophone (9)
 Chris Rodriguez – backing vocals (1, 4, 6)
 Jimmie Lee Sloas – backing vocals (1, 4, 6), electric piano (2), bass (2), arrangements (2), vocals (6)
 Judson Spence – backing vocals (1, 4, 6)

Production
 Mark Maxwell – A&R direction 
 Brian Tankersley – producer, recording, mixing 
 Joan Tankersley – art direction, styling 
 Phillip Spencer – design, lettering 
 Victoria Pearson – all photography
 John Keoni – hair 
 Carter Bradley – make-up
 Mike Dixon – management

Charts

Radio singles

Music videos
Boyce also released a companion video on VHS titled Time and Again Videos featuring music videos for "I Just Want to Celebrate" and "Not for Me" plus a backstage interview.

References

1988 albums
Kim Boyce albums
Myrrh Records albums
Word Records albums